Sandro Stielicke (born 30 November 1986 in Rostock) is a German skeleton racer who has competed since 2005. His best World Cup finish was third at Altenberg, Germany in December 2008.

Stelicke qualified for the 2010 Winter Olympics, finishing tenth.

References
 

1986 births
German male skeleton racers
Living people
Olympic skeleton racers of Germany
Sportspeople from Rostock
Skeleton racers at the 2010 Winter Olympics
21st-century German people